Jorge Cabrera may refer to:

 Jorge Cabrera (basketball) (born 1974), Uruguayan basketball player
 Jorge Cabrera (politician), member of the Connecticut State Senate
 Jorge Castillo Cabrera (born 1946), Mexican IRP politician
 Jorge Molina Cabrera (born 1988), Peruvian midfield footballer
 Jorge Cabrera (footballer) (born 1963), Uruguyan footballer
 Jorge Cabrera (athlete) (born 1981), Paraguyan long-distance runner